Brian Walton (160029 November 1661) was an English Anglican priest, divine and scholar.

Life
Walton was born at Seymour, in the district of Cleveland, Yorkshire. His early education was at the Newcastle Royal Free Grammar School. He went up to Cambridge as a sizar of Magdalene College in 1616, migrated to Peterhouse in 1618, was bachelor in 1619 and Master of Arts in 1623. After holding a school mastership at Suffolk and two curacies (the second as curate of All-hallows, Bread Street), he was made rector of St Martin's Ongar in London, and of Sandon, in Essex, in 1626. At St Martin's Ongar he took a leading part in the contest between the London clergy and the citizens about the city tithes, and compiled a treatise on the subject, which is printed in Brewster's Collectanea (1752). His conduct in this matter displayed his ability, but his zeal for the exaction of ecclesiastical dues was remembered in 1641 in the articles brought against him in parliament, which appear to have led to the sequestration of his very considerable preferments. He was also charged with Popish practices, but on frivolous grounds, and with aspersing the members of parliament for the city. His arms were: Three geese passant close.

In 1642 he was ordered into custody as a delinquent; thereafter he took refuge in Oxford, and ultimately returned to London to the house of William Fuller (1580?–1659), dean of Ely, whose daughter Jane was his second wife. In this retirement he gave himself to Oriental studies and carried through his great work, a Polyglot Bible which should be completer, cheaper and provided with a better critical apparatus than any previous work of the kind.

He was buried in Old St Paul's Cathedral in London, but the grave and monument were destroyed in the Great Fire of London in 1666. His name appears on a modern monument in the crypt, listing important graves lost in the fire.

Polyglot Bible

The proposals for the Polyglot appeared in 1652. The book itself came out in six great folios. The first volume appeared in September 1654; the second in July 1655; the third in July 1656; and the last three in 1657. Nine languages are used: Hebrew, Aramaic, Samaritan, Syriac, Arabic, Persian, Ethiopic, Greek and Latin. Among his collaborators were James Ussher, John Lightfoot and Edward Pococke, Edmund Castell, Abraham Wheelocke and Patrick Young, Thomas Hyde and Thomas Greaves. The great undertaking was the first in England supported by subscription - £50 each. Walton's political opinions did not deprive him of the help of the Commonwealth; the paper used was freed from duty, and the interest of Cromwell in the work was acknowledged in the original preface, part of which was afterwards cancelled to make way for more loyal expressions towards that restored monarchy under which Oriental studies in England immediately began to languish. Two versions of the work, one dedicated to Cromwell, and the other known as the "Loyal" one. To Walton himself, however, the Restoration brought no disappointment: he was elected Bishop of Chester on 19 October 1660, confirmed to that See 22 November, and consecrated a bishop on 2 December 1660. In the following spring he was one of the commissioners at the Savoy Conference, but took little part in the business. In the autumn of 1661 he paid a short visit to his diocese, and returning to London he died.

According to an assessment in Chisholm (1911):

In 1669, Dr. Edmund Castell published the Lexicon Heptaglotton in two folio volumes. This was a lexicon of the seven Oriental languages used in Walton's Polyglot, and had grammars of those languages prefixed.

Manuscripts used by Walton 
 Codex Montfortianus
 Minuscule 47
 Minuscule 57
 Minuscule 96
 Minuscule 2818

See also

Notes

References

External links
 
 
 

1600 births
1661 deaths
People from Redcar and Cleveland
Participants in the Savoy Conference
Alumni of Magdalene College, Cambridge
Alumni of Peterhouse, Cambridge
Bishops of Chester
People educated at the Royal Grammar School, Newcastle upon Tyne
English Calvinist and Reformed theologians
17th-century Calvinist and Reformed theologians
Burials at St Paul's Cathedral
Clergy from Yorkshire